Awa v Independent News Auckland Ltd [1997] 3 NZLR 590  is a cited case in New Zealand regarding the defence of fair comment / honest opinion to a claim involving defamation

Background
In the aftermath of the death of comedian Billy T. James, his uncle Awa took his body away from his Pakeha wife, in order to give him a customary Māori burial at his ancestral marae.

Auckland's Sunday News newspaper covered it with a quote referring to Awa as "Billy's 'body snatching' uncle".

Awa subsequently sued for defamation, which the newspaper claimed was "fair comment".

Held
The Court held it was fair comment.

References

Court of Appeal of New Zealand cases
New Zealand tort case law
1997 in New Zealand law
1997 in case law